Maharshi Sandipani Rashtriya Ved Vidya Pratishthan (MSRVVP), under the Ministry of Education, for the preservation, conservation and development of Vedic Studies by establishing and supporting Ved Pathshalas. It has around 450 institutes across India where students spend seven years memorising the Vedas as well as studying subjects like Sanskrit, English, Maths and Social Science.
MSRVVP also runs the Maharshi Sandipani Rashtriya Veda Sanskrit Shiksha Board (MSRVSSB), a national-level school education board which grants the Veda Bhushan (10th) and Veda Vibhushan' (12th) certificates recognised by the AIU and AICTE.

Etymology
MSRVVP is named after Sandipani, the guru of lord Krishna.

History
It was established in 1987 at Delhi under then Minister of Education, P. V. Narasimha Rao, and it was moved to Ujjain in Madhya Pradesh in 1993.

Vedic education
Institutes under MSRVVP appoint professors and associate professors of Vedic studies from recognised universities.

Vedic & Sanskrit Education Board: Maharshi Sandipani Rashtriya Veda Sanskrit Shiksha Board (MSRVSSB)

Maharshi Sandipani Rashtriya Veda Sanskrit Shiksha Board (MSRVSSB), which literally means the Saint Sandipani National Vedic Sanskrit Education Board'', 
is a national-level school education board which grants the Veda Bhushan (10th) and Veda Vibhushan (12th) certificates. Along with the modern subjects, students are also taught Hindu scriptures, vedas, upnishads, ayurveda and sanskrit. MSRVSSB is run by the Maharshi Sandipani Rashtriya Ved Vidya Pratisthan (MSRVVP), which already runs several vedic schools. Govt of India has granted legal authority to MSRVSSB to affiliate and recognise vedic and sanskrit schools run by other organisations. Since August 2022, Association of Indian Universities (AIU) & AICTE (All India Council for Technical Education) formally recognise the 10th and 12th certificates from MSRVSSB as equivalent to those issued by other 10th and 12th education boards in India. MSRVSSB is the first dedicated board for Vedic education and sanskrit education in India, and Prime Minister Narendra Modi's government is credited with making this happen.

In August 2022, MSRVSSB was granted recognition and equivalence by AIU), after which year 10 and year 12 completion certificate from the MSRVSB are equally recognised the qualification for admission into other tertiary institution for a higher degree. In September 2022, AICTE (All India Council for Technical Education), India's regulatory body for the accreditation of technical and engineering education, also issued instruction to all the institutes affiliation with AICTE to recognize the MSRVSSB 10th & 12th certificates as eligible for admission into technical courses.

Earlier in 2016, based on  the recommendation of Sanskrit experts and representatives of gurukuls and ved pathshalas, HRD Minister Smriti Irani had announced that there are plans to set up nation's first Vedic Education Board along the lines of CBSE under MSRVVP for teaching Vedas and Sanskrit along with modern subjects. Rashtriya Swayamsevak Sangh (RSS) and Bharatiya Shikshan Mandal had been pushing for the streamlining of nearly 5,000 gurukuls in the nation by creating an interchangeable system for enabling gurukul students to move to formal schooling, though some people have advocated it to a voluntary registration because the uniformity of curriculum would deprive gurukuls of their individual way of teaching. The idea was originally mooted by Baba Ramdev, who offered to set up the private vedic education board under his organisation, which was rejected by the government.

See also

 List of Modern Sanskrit universities
 Revival of Sanskrit education by states
 Sanskrit education

References

External links 
 

Sanskrit universities in India
Universities in Madhya Pradesh
Buildings and structures in Ujjain
Education in Ujjain
School boards in India